Lab-e-Shireen is a traditional Pakistani custard-like dessert. It is often served during the month of Ramadan or during the days of Eid. It is served topped with vermicelli, cream, jelly, and fresh and dried fruits. Lab e Shireen is one of the most popular desserts in the modern cooking of Pakistan.

Etymology 
The name of the confectionery comes from two Persian and Urdu words, lab, meaning "lips" , and shireen, meaning "sweet". The dish translates to "sweet lips" or "honeyed lips".

History 
It has recently been prepared in the past 5–10 years when the pasta industries of Pakistan begins to produce flavoured and coloured vermicelli.

Ingredients 

 Coloured vermicelli sugar 
 Almonds 
 Pistachio 
 Raisin 
 Milk 
 Custard powder 
 vanilla flavour 
 Sugar  
 Cream 
 Rooh Afza Syrup (Red Syrup)
 Fruits

References 

Pakistani desserts
Custard desserts